Bruno Felipe de Abreu Barbosa (born 16 December 1993), commonly known as Bruninho, is a professional Brazilian footballer who currently plays as a left back for C.D. Aves.

Career

Aves
On 28 June 2019, Bruninho joined Portuguese club C.D. Aves on a two-year contract.

References

External links

Living people
1993 births
Brazilian footballers
Brazilian expatriate footballers
Campeonato Brasileiro Série A players
Campeonato Brasileiro Série B players
Campeonato Brasileiro Série C players
Primeira Liga players
Vila Nova Futebol Clube players
Atlético Clube Goianiense players
Clube Atlético Bragantino players
Paraná Clube players
Boa Esporte Clube players
Fortaleza Esporte Clube players
Tombense Futebol Clube players
C.D. Aves players
Association football defenders
Brazilian expatriate sportspeople in Portugal
Expatriate footballers in Portugal